Bengt Jönsson (Oxenstierna), (1390s–1450s) Swedish statesman and noble. 
Under the Kalmar Union, he served as co-regent of Sweden, from January to June 1448, together with his brother Nils Jönsson (Oxenstierna). Member of the Privy Council of Sweden from 1435, and magistrate of Uppland in 1439. Dubbed as knight by King Christopher of Bavaria following his coronation in 1441, and Master of the Royal Court from the same year.

His farm was Salsta manor (Salsta slott) at Lena parish in Norunda, Uppland. He made large donations to Tensta Church (Tensta kyrka) and was featured in a fresco made in 1437 by the artist Johannes Rosenrod. 

He married in 1416 with Kristina Kristiernsdotter (Vasa), widow of Karl Stensson Blad, with whom he had four sons including  Jöns Bengtsson Oxenstierna, Archbishop of Uppsala (1448–1467).

See also
Oxenstierna

References

Further reading
 Cornell, Henrik; Sigurd Wallin (1962) Johannes Rosenrod: Ein Schwedischer Maler von 1437 (Stockholm: Albert Bonnier)

External links

Oxenstierna, Bengt Jonsson
Oxenstierna, Bengt Jonsson
Oxenstierna family
15th-century Swedish nobility